Liverios Gerakaris (c. 1644 – 1710), more commonly known by the hypocoristic Limberakis,  was a Maniot pirate who later became Bey of Mani.

Limberakis Gerakaris was born in Mani in around 1644. He served as a rower in a Venetian galley before becoming a pirate. After several years, he was captured by the Ottomans and imprisoned. After a failed attempt to capture Mani, the Ottoman Grand Vizier, Köprülü Fazıl Ahmed Pasha, offered Gerakaris his freedom and to make him Bey of Mani in return for allowing the Turks to garrison some castles in Mani.

In his brief reign, he forced several families to flee from the Mani. He soon returned to piracy and was imprisoned again by the Ottomans. However, when the Venetians invaded the Peloponnese in 1685, the Ottomans released Gerakaris and made him ruler of Mani, and in return he promised to fight for the Turks. When the Turks unsuccessfully attempted to poison him, he defected to the Venetians, who acknowledged him as Bey of Mani. In 1696, he sacked Arta because the citizens of the city had burned his property nearby. The Artans complained to the Venetian Doge, who had him imprisoned in Brescia, where he died in 1710.

Early years
Limberakis Gerakaris was born in Oitylo, Mani in ca. 1644. By the age of 15, he was serving as a galley rower in the Venetian navy. He is next heard of five years later, as a feared pirate. After three years of piracy, he was captured by the Ottomans and imprisoned in the Bagnio of Constantinople. Meanwhile, the Ottoman Grand Vizier, Köprülü Fazıl Ahmed Pasha, who had successfully conquered Crete from the Venetians during the Cretan War (1645-1669), sent the pirate Hasan Baba to subdue Mani because they had assisted the Venetians in the war. However, Baba's attack failed and Köprülü was forced to turn to Gerakaris for assistance. Köprülü offered him freedom and promised to make him Bey of Mani in return for allowing Turkish garrisons to take some Maniot castles as well as paying tribute to the Ottomans. Gerakaris accepted and was freed.

Rule and capture
When Limberakis returned to Mani, he ruled like a tyrant with the backing of the Turkish garrisons in Kelefa and Porto Kagio, although the Turks were boxed into the castles by the surrounding Maniots. He made life so difficult for his enemies, the Stefanopouli family and some other families, that they were forced into self-exile, with 700 people moving to Corsica, where they were granted asylum by Genoa. However, Limberakis soon fell out with the Turks and turned to piracy, raiding not only Ottoman but European ships. The Ottomans responded by capturing him during a raid in 1682 and taking him back to Constantinople, where he was imprisoned in the Bagnio.

Return and downfall

In 1684, the Venetians led by Francesco Morosini invaded the Peloponnese with Maniot assistance. The Ottomans, pressed by the Habsburgs, were unable to hold the Peloponnese, so the new Grand Vizier Merzifonlu Kara Mustafa Pasha suggested that Gerakaris be released from the Bagnio. Gerakaris accepted on the condition that he was given the title "His Highness, the Ruler of Mani" and that an amnesty was given to all the people of Greece. This was important because it was the first time the Sultan had recognised the autonomy of Mani. Limberakis joined the Ottoman army at Thebes and over the next few years launched several invasions of the Peloponnese. Limberakis, however, defected to the Venetians in 1696 after the Turks tried to unsuccessfully poison him. The Venetians pronounced him a knight of Saint Mark and continued to call him Bey of Mani. However, his disloyalty caused him to lose credibility with both the Turks and the Venetians. Later that year, Limberakis led a brutal sacking of Arta in retaliation for the Artans burning his property in Karpenisi. However, some Artans escaped and complained to the Doge, who had Gerakaris arrested and imprisoned at Brescia until his death in 1710.

References

Sources
Greenhalgh, Peter and Eliopoulos, Edward. Deep into Mani: Journey to the Southern Tip of Greece. London: Trinity Press, 1985. 
Kassis, Kyriakos. Mani's History. Athens: Presoft, 1979.

1640s births
1710 deaths
17th-century Greek people
Greek pirates
Ottoman Greece
People of the Great Turkish War
People of the Ottoman–Venetian Wars
Greek prisoners and detainees
Prisoners and detainees of the Ottoman Empire
Prisoners and detainees of the Republic of Venice
People from East Mani